The , abbreviated to Yokuseikai or IRAPA, was the political wing of the Imperial Rule Assistance Association and a joint caucus of both the House of Representatives and the House of Peers that existed between 20 May 1942 to 30 March 1945.

In Japanese history, the Imperial Rule Assistance Political Association established the "one country, one party" system.

History 
Although candidates who received the endorsement of the IRAA and its affiliated Imperial Rule Assistance Young Men's Corps won a commanding majority in the elections of 30 April 1942, 85 unendorsed candidates who were critical of Prime Minister Hideki Tojo’s cabinet were also elected. Tojo, who was concerned about this, invited 70 representatives from the political world, the business community, and the press to form the Imperial Rule Assistance Political Consolidation Preparation Committee on 7 May and he appointed as its chairman Masatsune Ogura, a former finance minister from the Sumitomo Group. Afterwards seven more members including five active cabinet members joined. Starting with these 77, a membership list, platform, and rules were announced on 14 May and notes requesting participation in a new proposed organization were sent to prominent men in Japanese society, all the while maintaining the facade of an organization by interested volunteers. However, in reality, the Imperial Rule Assistance Diet Members' League, the IRAA's affiliate in the House of Representatives and parent body of the endorsed candidates in the last election, had simply disbanded and formed the core of the new group. The Home Ministry also revealed its plans to immediately certify the new group's status as a political organization but by contrast to order the dissolution of all other parliamentary caucuses, such as Ichiro Hatoyama’s Fraternity Association and others, which had been formed by the unendorsed candidates after the previous election. No successor groups were recognized, and because of that unless the elected representatives affiliated with the new group, further political activity would be impossible.

And so, from the work of the Imperial Rule Assistance Political Consolidation Preparation Committee, the new Imperial Rule Assistance Political Association was established on 20 May. Its first president was Former Prime Minister Nobuyuki Abe, head of the IRAA’s council to endorse candidates in the last election. Out of the 466 members in the House of Representatives, 458 joined, all of them except two members who were being prosecuted for criminal offenses and six members of the Tohokai group who fought dissolution. Three days later, the Tohokai was also compelled to disband and all of its members ending up being forcibly integrated into the Imperial Rule Assistance Political Association. Even in the House of Peers, where adherence was voluntary and de facto duel membership in pre-existing caucuses was permitted, 326 of the 411 members joined the Imperial Rule Assistance Political Association. However, because the caucuses of the House of Peers were close knit and were not supposed to engage in political activities, and considering the House of Peers’ traditional role since its establishment of defending the interests of the government, Japan had more or less put in place the "one country, one party" system.

The platform of the IRAPA called for the rallying of political forces across the country, close cooperation with the IRAA, and the setting up of the so-called "Imperial Rule Assistance Parliament" uniting all factions. Due to the fact that this platform was swiftly passed without amendment as part of government-sponsored legislation, members of the Imperial Diet were henceforth bound to cooperate in the prosecution of the war. An executive council consisting of 29 members was set up as the organization's highest organ. Non-Diet members such as Aiichiro Fujiyama occupied a majority of the positions, but at the same time the permanent members who conducted proceedings in the Imperial Diet comprised seven members from each house of the legislature. From the House of Representatives Yonezo Maeda, Tadao Oasa, Ryūtarō Nagai, and Tatsunosuke Yamazaki were among those elected and those from the House of Peers included Fumio Gotō, Takuo Godo, Sotaro Ishiwata, and Nagakage Okabe.

Next, in order to accomplish the goal that was held up in the party's platform of establishing an "Imperial Rule Assistance Parliament", broad powers were given to the permanent members of the executive council and Diet members who were critical of the Tojo cabinet including those had just been absorbed from other groups were deprived of their right to speak both within the Diet and within the IRAPA. And yet at the same time, though it was said to preside over an "Imperial Rule Assistance Parliament", the IRAPA also included elements of a "catch-all party", and the Tojo cabinet and the militarists found that it was not always a pliant rubber stamp and would still provoke conflicts with them. Seeking to avoid such conflicts and maintain the facade of national unity, Tojo and the military had no choice but to let the permanent members of the executive council enter the cabinet and to ask for their cooperation while paying heed to their wishes in the decision-making process on domestic policies.

However, factional activity in the House of Representatives soon began to manifest itself mirroring that of old parties such as the Rikken Seiyukai and Rikken Minseito. Conflicts over policy ended up being provoked even by first-time assemblymen who won election in 1942, including members of the Imperial Rule Assistance Young Men's Corps who were a product of the one-party system as well as the established far-right like Bin Akao and Ryoichi Sasakawa who were skeptical about the new system. Furthermore, to avoid promoting disunity the IRAPA did not have its own regional branches, which were instead left to the IRAA, but this meant that campaigning for the next election would not be possible. Although there was agitation for a merger with the local operations of the IRAA, this was quashed by the opposition of Prime Minister Tojo.  Then in June 1943, six members of the House of Representatives including Ichiro Hatoyama and Seigo Nakano ended up breaking away from the IRAPA.

Even so, while the Tojo cabinet continued, the "Imperial Rule Assistance Parliament" and the Political Association that supported it kept the system solid for a time. However, in July 1944 Governor-General of Korea Kuniaki Koiso succeeded Tojo as prime minister and when Nobuyuki Abe in turn was appointed Governor-General in place of Koiso, the post of President of the IRAPA fell in August to former Commander-in-Chief of the Combined Fleet Seizo Kobayashi. After that, rents started to develop within the Association. While doubts were being harbored about his leadership skills, Kobayashi was appointed Minister of State by the Koiso cabinet in December 1944 and a restructuring of the IRAPA and IRAA was ordered by Koiso in preparation for the expected invasion of Japan. Koiso and Kobayashi laid out a policy to dissolve the IRAA, the IRAPA, and the Imperial Rule Assistance Young Men's Corps, and to replace them with a new party fully integrating the entire nation, including integration of the regional branches of the IRAA. Although this policy to form a new party was rapidly accepted by a meeting of IRAPA Diet members on 20 January 1945 and was formally announced by President Kobayashi on 12 February, it was opposed by the senior members of the IRAA and Diet members belonging to the Imperial Rule Assistance Young Men's Corps who as minority factions were excluded from the decision-making process.

It then became clear that Nobusuke Kishi, along with dissidents who were dissatisfied with President Kobayashi, was working out a scheme to promote Yosuke Matsuoka as the new president. Because of this, the IRAPA was thrown into turmoil from the inside, and the dissidents along with Diet members of the Imperial Rule Assistance Young Men's Corps who opposed Kobayashi declared their secession one by one. In response, Kobayashi resigned as Minister of State on 1 March and made every effort to mollify his opponents and organize the new party, but at the time of the founding of the new party's preparation committee on 8 March the plan was already in shambles. Diet members of the Imperial Rule Assistance Young Men's Corps said that they would not participate in the IRAPA or it successor and instead formed the Association of Imperial Assistance Dietmen on 10 March and Kishi's dissidents followed suit on 11 March and formed the Association for Defense of the Fatherland. Observing this situation, the House of Peers also decided to opt out of joining the new party and though the IRAPA finally dissolved on 30 March 1945 and was replaced with the Greater Japan Political Association under President Jiro Minami, the "one country, one party" system of the "Imperial Rule Assistance Parliament" had effectively collapsed and Japan would end up losing the war.

List of presidents of the IRAPA

See also 
Imperial Rule Assistance Association

References 

Japan in World War II
Shōwa Statism
Politics of the Empire of Japan
1942 establishments in Japan
1945 disestablishments in Japan
Political parties established in 1942
Political parties disestablished in 1945